The 1994 LPGA Tour was the 45th season since the LPGA Tour officially began in 1950. The season ran from February 4 to November 6. The season consisted of 32 official money events. Beth Daniel won the most tournaments, four. Laura Davies led the money list with earnings of $687,201.

There were five first-time winners in 1994: Marta Figueras-Dotti, Carolyn Hill, Lisa Kiggens, Woo-Soon Ko, and Missie McGeorge.

The tournament results and award winners are listed below.

Tournament results
The following table shows all the official money events for the 1994 season. "Date" is the ending date of the tournament. The numbers in parentheses after the winners' names are the number of wins they had on the tour up to and including that event. Majors are shown in bold.

* – non-member at time of win

Awards

References

External links
LPGA Tour official site
1994 season coverage at golfobserver.com

LPGA Tour seasons
LPGA Tour